Kerrier was a local government district in Cornwall, England, United Kingdom. It was the most southerly district in the United Kingdom, other than the Isles of Scilly. Its council was based in Camborne. Other towns in the district included Redruth and Helston. The district also contained the Lizard Peninsula.

Kerrier is named after one of the ancient administrative Hundreds of Cornwall, Kerrier, which covered broadly the same area, but did not have a coast on the north.

The district was formed on 1 April 1974, as a merger of the borough of Helston, the urban district of Camborne-Redruth and Kerrier Rural District. On 25 July 2007, Cornwall County Council's bid for unitary authority status was accepted by the government. Kerrier District Council was abolished on 1 April 2009 as part of structural changes to local government in England.

Cornish musician Luke Vibert has released a number of albums and singles under the alias Kerrier District, as a nod to New York musicians Metro Area and a tribute to the place where he grew up.

See also
Kerrier District Council elections

References

External links

 Kerrier District Council website
 Kerrier Local election results 2007
 Cornwall Record Office Online Catalogue for Kerrier District Council

Districts of England established in 1974
English districts abolished in 2009
Former non-metropolitan districts of Cornwall